Navidad Bank is a submerged bank in the Atlantic Ocean north of the Dominican Republic and southeast of the Territory of Turks & Caicos. It is separated from Silver Bank by the wide Navidad Bank Passage.

Geography
Navidad Bank is a shallow underwater area composed of coral and sand that almost reaches the ocean's surface, but is wholly submerged. At low tide, a few small locations appear awash at the water's surface. There is a least-known depth of  located on the east side of the north end of the bank. It is not suitable for boating navigation of any kind, except by small craft, whose operators must be extremely careful. From the earliest colonial times, Navidad Bank has been the scene of multiple shipwrecks.

This area is considered part of the Dominican Republic. A Dominican presidential decree on July 5, 1996, included the area in the Sanctuary for the Marine Mammals of the Dominican Republic.

Navidad Bank has a wealth of corals and is a safe haven for marine mammals, including the humpback whale. The humpback whales have long used the bank as a breeding and calving ground. As such, tourism focuses on tours to view the whales and other sea life. The Bank is visited by scuba divers.

Just to the northwest is the Silver Bank, also under the jurisdiction of the Dominican Republic.

Navidad Bank, Silver Bank, as well as Mouchoir Bank further northwest, plus the Turks and Caicos Islands, are considered a geographic continuation of the Lucayan Archipelago.

References

External links
Provincetown Center for Coastal Studies website
Sailing Directions, Caribbean Sea Vol. I

Undersea banks of the Caribbean Sea
Geography of the Dominican Republic